Somerset 1 (known as Tribute Somerset 1 for sponsorship reasons) is an English rugby union league which sits at the ninth level of league rugby union in England involving teams based in the county of Somerset as well as some teams based in Bristol.  1st, 2nd and even 3rd XV sides can participate in the division as long as they are not from the same club.

The league champions and runners up are promoted to Somerset Premier while relegated teams drop to either Somerset 2 North or Somerset 2 South depending on location.  Each year clubs in this division also take part in the RFU Junior Vase – a level 9–12 national competition.

Teams 2021-22

2020–21
Due to the COVID-19 pandemic, the 2020–21 season was cancelled.

Teams 2019–20

Original teams
When league rugby began in 1987 this division contained the following teams:

Burnham-on-Sea
Crewkerne
Frome
Hornets
North Petherton
Old Culverhaysians
Oldfield Old Boys
Old Sulians
Walcot Old Boys
Wellington
Yeovil

Somerset 1 honours

Somerset 1 (1987–1993)

The original Somerset 1 was a tier 9 league with promotion to Gloucestershire/Somerset and relegation to Somerset 2.

Somerset 1 (1993–1996)

The creation of National League 5 South for the 1993–94 season meant that Somerset 1 dropped to become a tier 10 league.  Promotion continued to Gloucestershire/Somerset 1 and relegation to Somerset 2.

Somerset 1 (1996–2000)

The cancellation of National League 5 South at the end of the 1995–96 season meant that Somerset 1 reverted to being a tier 9 league.  Promotion continued to Gloucestershire/Somerset and relegation to Somerset 2.

Somerset 1 (2000–2006)

The cancellation of Gloucestershire/Somerset at the end of the 1999–00 season, saw Somerset 1 remain at tier 9, with promotion now to the new Somerset Premier and relegation continuing to Somerset 2.

Somerset 1 (2006–2009)

Somerset 1 remained a tier 9 league with promotion to Somerset Premier but the splitting of Somerset 2 into two regional divisions, meant that relegation was now to either Somerset 2 North or Somerset 2 South.  From the 2007–08 season onward the league sponsor would be Tribute.

Somerset 1 (2009–present)

Despite widespread restructuring by the RFU at the end of the 2008–09 season, Somerset 1 remained a tier 9 league, with promotion continuing to Somerset Premier, while relegation to either Somerset 2 North or Somerset 2 South.  The league would continued to be sponsored by Tribute.

Number of league titles

Minehead Barbarians (3)
Chard (2)
Frome (2)
Gordano (2)
Nailsea & Backwell (2)
St. Bernadette's Old Boys (2)
Winscombe (2)
Avon (1)
Bridgwater & Albion II (1)
Bristol Barbarians (1)
Bristol Harlequins (1)
Burnham-on-Sea (1)
Chew Valley (1)
Clevedon II (1)
Hornets (1)
Hornets II (1)
Midsomer Norton (1)
Old Culverhaysians (1)
Old Redcliffians II (1)
Old Sulians (1)
Oldfield Old Boys (1)
Tor (1)
Wellington (1)
Wells (1)
Wiveliscombe (1)

Notes

See also 
 South West Division RFU
 Somerset RFU
 Somerset Premier
 Somerset 2 North
 Somerset 2 South
 Somerset 3 North
 Somerset 3 South
 English rugby union system
 Rugby union in England

References 

9
Rugby union in Somerset
Rugby union in Bristol